Gutturnium is a genus of predatory sea snails, marine gastropod mollusks in the family Cymatiidae.

Species
The only species within the genus Gutturnium is:
 Gutturnium muricinum (Röding, 1798)
Species brought into synonymy
 Gutturnium gracile (Reeve, 1844): synonym of Reticutriton pfeifferianus (Reeve, 1844)

References

 Connolly, M. (1929). Notes on African non-marine Mollusca, with descriptions of many new species. The Annals and Magazine of Natural History, (10) 3 (14): 165-178, pl. 5. London.

External links
 Mörch, O. A. L. (1852-1853). Catalogus conchyliorum quae reliquit D. Alphonso d'Aguirra & Gadea Comes de Yoldi [.... Fasc. 1, Cephalophora, 170 pp. [1852]; Fasc. 2, Acephala, Annulata, Cirripedia, Echinodermata, 74 [+2] pp. [1853]. Hafniae [Copenhagen]: L. Klein]

Cymatiidae
Monotypic gastropod genera